The Rombo language, or Kirombo, is a Bantu language of Tanzania spoken by the Chaga people, in the Chaga area of the Kilimanjaro region. Rombo forms a dialect continuum with other Chaga languages.

Rombo dialects are Useri (Kiseri), Mashati (Kimashati), Mkuu (Kimkuu), and Mengwe (Kimengwe).

See also
 Tanzania

References

Languages of Tanzania
Chaga languages